John Michael Bazalgette Leeston-Smith (12 December 1916 – 5 December 2001) was a British film and television director.

Leeston-Smith took a job at Ealing Studios in 1932, aged 16. He worked there as a photographer and assistant sound engineer. In 1938 he was sent by the BBC to their studios in Daventry.

During the Second World War, Leeston-Smith was part of the Royal Horse Artillery. After the war, he got a job at Alexandra Palace studios. In 1953, he took a job as a sound engineer on the BBC Television serial The Quatermass Experiment and two years later was a production assistant on the sequel, Quatermass II. In the 1960s, Leeston-Smith started work as a director. He directed a number of episodes of Z-Cars, R3 and the Doctor Who serial The Myth Makers. After a period as a freelance director, Leeston-Smith moved to South Africa in 1973 to work for the SABC when it was starting up its television broadcasts. He died in December 2001 at the age of 84.

References

External links

1916 births
2001 deaths
British film directors
British television directors